Altan is a male Turkish given name used also as first name and a Mongolian given name. Altan means "golden" in Mongolian and "red dawn" in Turkic. The related word "Altın" is also Turkish for "golden" and a common Turkish first name.

Given name
 Altan Aksoy,  a Turkish football player
  (born 1969), Turkish painter
  (born 1969), Turkish singer-songwriter
  (born 1944), Turkish archaeologist
 Altan Debter,  an early, now lost history of the Mongols
  (1936-2012), Turkish historian, writer and journalist
 Altan Dinçer (1932-2010), Turkish basketball player
 Engin Altan Düzyatan (born 1979), Turkish actor
  (1929-1988), Turkish cartoonist, actor, journalist
 Altan Erkekli, a Turkish theatre and film actor
 Altan Erol, a Turkish professional basketball player
  (born 1958), Turkish actor
  (1931-2014), Turkish actor and director
  (born 1986), Turkish football player
  (born 1938), Turkish retired diplomat
  (1935-2012), Turkish ambassador
 Altan Karındaş (born 1928), Turkish actor and voice actor
  (born 1936), Turkish politician
 Altan Khan, a Mongol ruler (1507–1582)
 Altan Khan of the Khotgoid, a succession of rulers of north-western Mongolia in the 17th century
  (born 1940), Turkish INdustiralist
 Altan Öymen, a Turkish journalist, author and former politician
  (born 1958), Turkish writer and politician
 Altan Telgey, a Mongol earth goddess
 Altan Tobchi, a 17th-century Mongolian chronicle written by Guush Luvsandanzan
  (born 1941),Turkish bureaucrat
 Altan Urag, a Mongolian folk rock band

Surname
 Ahmet Altan (born 1950), Turkish journalist and author
  (born 1968), former member of Turkish Constitutional Court
 Berfin Altan (born 2003), Turkish women's goalball player
  (born 1946), Turkish ambassador
 Çetin Altan (1927-2015), Turkish writer, journalist, and former member of parliament
  (born 1940), Turkish businessman
  (born 1948), Turkish politician
  (1871-1927), Turkish politician
 Kamil Altan(1924-2011), Turkish footballer.
 Mehmet Altan (born 1953), Turkish economist, columnist and writer
  (born 1931), Turkish painter
 Francesco Tullio Altan (born 1942), Italian satire and comic book author
 Kaan Altan, a founding member of the Turkish rock band Mavi Sakal
 Saadet İkesus Altan (1916-2007), Turkish opera singer, vocal coach and opera director

See also
 Altan, Irish folk band
 Altan (disambiguation), other uses

References

Turkish-language surnames
Turkish feminine given names
Turkish masculine given names
Mongolian given names